William Loren Katz (June 2, 1927 – October 25, 2019) was an American teacher, historian, and author of 40 books on African-American history, including a number of titles for young adult readers. He was particularly noted for his research and writing on the 500-year history of relations between African Americans and Native Americans. His books include Breaking the Chains: African American Slave Resistance, The Black West, and Black Women of the Old West.

Biography
Born in New York, NY, Katz was the son of Ben (a researcher) and Madeline (Simon) Katz. After graduating high school in 1944, Katz joined the Navy at the age of 17 and then went onto use the GI Bill to further his education. A graduate of Syracuse University (Bachelor of Arts in history, 1950) and of New York University (Master of Arts in Secondary Education, 1952), Katz taught in New York City and State public secondary education systems for 14 years. He served as a consultant to the U.S. Senate, the British House of Commons, and the Smithsonian Institution; the state boards of education of North Carolina and New York; school districts from California to Florida and England. He was married to Dr. Laurie Lehman, an associate professor of special education in the Department of Teaching and Learning at Long Island University's Brooklyn Campus, and an early authority and writer on disability studies. He was the father of two children, Michael and Naomi, and a grandfather to Maya.

Katz's "Education and Books" column appeared in the New York Daily Challenge; contributed articles to the Amsterdam News and many other publications; he hosted an interview program on Pacifica Radio station WBAI-FM in New York, and appeared on many TV and radio programs hosted by Indigenous Americans and African Americans.  He was the recipient of the 2000 White Dove Imani Peace Award from the White Dove-Imani-Rainbow Lodge of Whitehall, Ohio.

He spoke at more than 50 universities and dozens of museums, and libraries, including The American Museum of Natural History, the Smithsonian Institution, The Western History Association to Johns Hopkins University, The Institute for Texan Cultures, and the Schomburg Library. He became affiliated with New York University in 1973 and edited more than 220 research volumes for libraries. He edited the American Negro: His History and Literature book series for Arno Press.

His books, research, writing and lectures won several awards, including the 1991 Carter G. Woodson book award for Breaking the Chains. John Hope Franklin, Henry Louis Gates, Jr., John Henrik Clarke, Howard Zinn, James M. McPherson, Alice Walker, Cornel West, Ivan Van Sertima, Betty Shabazz, and Dr. Ralph Bunche have praised his works.

Career
 New York City public schools, New York, NY: teacher of American history, 1955–60 
 Greenburgh District 8 School System, Hartsdale, NY: high school teacher of American history, 1960–68
 New School for Social Research (now New School University), New York, NY: instructor in U.S. history, beginning 1977 
 Columbia University: Scholar-in-residence and research fellow, 1971–73 
 Lecturer on American Negro history at teacher institutes 
 Toombs Prison: teacher of black history 
 Testified before U.S. Senate on Negro history 
 Appearances on television and radio programs, including the Today Show 
 Consultant to President Kennedy's Committee on Juvenile Delinquency and Youth Development, Smithsonian Institution; U.S. Air Force schools in England, Belgium, and Holland, 1974–75; Inner London Educational Authority, 1982; British House of Commons; Life magazine; New York Times: Columbia Broadcasting System (CBS-TV).

In 2012 he received the National Underground Railroad to Freedom Award by the National Park Service and delivered the keynote address "The Underground Railroad that Ran South to Freedom" at its National Conference. He received an award for lifetime contributions to the literature for children of African descent from the Institute of African American Affairs of New York University, where he had been a scholar-in-residence.

Selected bibliography
 Black Indians: A Hidden Heritage (1997, Simon Pulse) 
 The Black West: A Documentary and Pictorial History of the African American Role in the Westward Expansion of the United States (1996, Touchstone) 
 Black Pioneers: An Untold Story (1999, Atheneum) 
 Breaking The Chains (1998, Simon Pulse) 
 Black Women of the Old West (1995, Atheneum) 
 Black Legacy: A History of New York's African Americans (1997, Atheneum) 
 Eyewitness: A Living Documentary of the African American Contribution to American History (1995, Touchstone) 
 The Cruel Years: American Voices at the Dawn of the Twentieth Century (with Laurie Lehman, 2001, Beacon Press)

Essays by Katz
 What Goes Around Comes Around Tuesday October 19, 2004
 The Meaning of Hugo Chávez Tuesday, August 24, 2004
 Iraq, the US and an Old Lesson Wednesday April 28, 2004
 Justice and African Seminoles March 15, 2001
 We Are Repeating the Mistake We Made in the Philippines 100 Years Ago May 3, 2004
 The Forgotten Fight Against Fascism June 13, 2014, on Common Dreams
 'The Birth of a Nation': A Century Later February 14, 2015, on Common Dreams

See also

 Black Indians in the United States
 Black Seminoles
 Native Americans in the United States
 Native American tribes
 One-Drop Rule
 Zambo

References

External links
 Official Site of William Loren Katz
 Simon & Schuster site – Books by William Loren Katz
 Democracy Now! – Eyewitness interview with William Loren Katz
 Review of Katz' website African Americans in the Spanish Civil War on Teachinghistory.org
 New York Times article "Restoring Black Cowboys to the Range" September 14, 2019

20th-century American historians
20th-century American male writers
21st-century American historians
21st-century American male writers
Jewish American historians
Historians of the United States
Historians of the American West
Historians of African Americans

American non-fiction children's writers
Syracuse University alumni
Steinhardt School of Culture, Education, and Human Development alumni
Historians from New York (state)
Military personnel from New York City
Writers from New York City
1927 births
2019 deaths
American male non-fiction writers
20th-century African-American writers
21st-century African-American writers
21st-century American Jews
African-American male writers